"Beautiful" is a song by Australian musical duo Disco Montego featuring guest vocals by Australian singer-songwriter Katie Underwood. It was released as the second single from the duo's second studio album, Disco Montego (2002), on 6 May 2002. The song reached No. 9 on the Australian ARIA Singles Chart and was certified gold. "Beautiful" was nominated for "Best Pop Release" at the 2002 ARIA Music Awards but lost to Kylie Minogue's Fever. The Michael Spiccia and Prodigy Films direct video was nominated for Best Video.

Track listing
Australian CD single
 "Beautiful" (radio edit) – 3:42 
 "Beautiful" (Thruster mix) – 6:24 
 "Beautiful" (T Vass Latin club mix) – 7:15 
 "Beautiful" (Studio 347 mix) – 5:51 
 "Beautiful" (James Ash mix) – 6:02

Charts

Weekly charts

Year-end charts

Certifications

References

2002 singles
2002 songs
APRA Award winners
Disco Montego songs